Ramanatha Sethupathy (died 1979) was the last Raja titleholder of Ramnad from 1967 to 1979. He was the next successor of the throne from his father, Shanmugha Rajeswara Sethupathi.

References 
 

1979 deaths
Year of birth missing